The 1998–99 Kentucky Wildcats men's basketball team represented University of Kentucky in the 1998–99 NCAA Division I men's basketball season. The head coach was Tubby Smith and the team finished the season with an overall record of 28–9.

Roster

References 

Kentucky Wildcats men's basketball seasons
Kentucky
Wild
Wild
Kentucky